Lille Luj och Änglaljus i strumpornas hus ("Lille Luj and Änglaljus in the House of Socks") was the Sveriges Television's Christmas calendar in 1983. It was directed by Staffan Westerberg. and features the two sock puppet characters Lillstrumpa and Syster Yster. A recurring theme was the phrase "Luj dog", which is "God jul" ("Merry Christmas" in Swedish) backwards.

References

External links 
 

1983 Swedish television series debuts
1983 Swedish television series endings
Sveriges Television's Christmas calendar
Swedish television shows featuring puppetry
Television shows set in Sweden